Tolla may refer to:

People
 Abeba Tolla (born 1977), Ethiopian long-distance runner
 Ada Tolla, Italian architect
 Gerardo di Tolla (born 1943), Peruvian sprinter
 Girma Tolla (born 1975), Ethiopian long-distance runner

Places
 Tolla, Corse-du-Sud, France
 Tolla, Estonia
 Tõlla, Estonia
 Lac de Tolla, Corse-du-Sud, France